The 1995 World Women's Curling Championship (branded as 1995 Ford World Women's Curling Championship for sponsorship reasons) was held at the Keystone Centre in Brandon, Manitoba, Canada from April 8–16, 1995.

Teams

Round robin standings

Round robin results

Draw 1

Draw 2

Draw 3

Draw 4

Draw 5

Draw 6

Draw 7

Draw 8

Draw 9

Playoffs

Brackets

Final

References
 

World Women's Curling Championship
Ford
Ford
Ford World Women
1995 in Canadian women's sports
1995 in women's curling
April 1995 sports events in Canada
Women's curling competitions in Canada
International sports competitions hosted by Canada